Paul Stoneman (born 26 February 1973) is an English professional footballer, who plays for semi-professional club West Allotment Celtic. He plays as a defender.

Stoneman began his career with Blackpool in 1991. After three seasons with the Seasiders he joined Colchester United, with whom he spent another season.

In 1995, he signed for Halifax Town. He went on to spend ten years with the Shaymen, making 174 league appearances and scoring seventeen goals. In 2003, Stoneman became the club's youth-team coach. He left Halifax in the summer of 2005 to join Harrogate Town, and later played for Wakefield before being named player-assistant manager at Bridlington in January 2007. In January 2008 he was relieved of his duties at Bridlington and subsequently signed as a player for Bradford Park Avenue a week later.

Honours
Blackpool
Division Four play-off winner: 1991-92
Halifax Town
Conference champion: 1998

Notes

References
Stoneman's profile at Soccerbase (incorrectly states he joined Blackpool in 1993)

1973 births
Living people
People from Whitley Bay
Footballers from Tyne and Wear
English footballers
Association football defenders
Blackpool F.C. players
Colchester United F.C. players
Halifax Town A.F.C. players
Harrogate Town A.F.C. players
Wakefield F.C. players
Bridlington Town A.F.C. players
Bradford (Park Avenue) A.F.C. players
West Allotment Celtic F.C. players
English Football League players
English football managers
Bridlington Town A.F.C. managers